Dimitrie Prelipcean (November 18, 1927 – July 29, 1987) was Romanian writer, whose works trace the history of his native Bukovina in the wake of World War II and the early years of the Communist regime.

He was born in Horodnic de Jos, Suceava County.

Works 
 Drumuri şi popasuri
 A fost odată
 Iubiri neîmplinite

1927 births
1987 deaths
People from Suceava County
Romanian writers